Mergim Laci (born 2 April 1998) is a Swedish footballer.

Career
Laci started playing in Getinge IF. He played for Rinia and Böljan before coming to Falkenbergs FF. He got his first team debut on 10 June 2018 in a 3-0 victory against Gefle IF. Laci was one out of six players who left the club at the end of 2019. 

In 2020, he signed for Tvååkers IF. He left the club at the end of 2021.

References

External links

Living people
1998 births
Association football midfielders
Swedish people of Albanian descent
Swedish footballers
Falkenbergs FF players
Tvååkers IF players
Allsvenskan players
Superettan players